Luu Yadanar Treasure   also Luu Yadannar Thike is a 2016 history and Love film directed by Ko Zaw (Ar Yone Oo) and starring Kyaw Ye Aung, Nay Min, Kaung Pyae, Thar Nyi, Aung Khaing, Ko Pauk and actress Soe Myat Thuzar, Thet Mon Myint,  Saung Eaindray Htun, Phu Phu, Phuu Pwint Thazin;in main roles. It is about the Luu ethnic group. It is one of the films that reached the highest-grossing film in Myanmar. The film had theatrical release in Myanmar on March 18, 2016.

This film was achieved Best Cinematography and Best Music-D’ramo Awards at Myanmar Motion Picture Academy Awards.

Cast
Kyaw Ye Aung
Nay Min
Kaung Pyae
Thar Nyi
Soe Myat Thuzar
Thet Mon Myint
Saung Eaindray Htun
Phu Phu 
Aung Khaing
Phuu Pwint Thazin
Ko Pauk

References

2016 films
2010s Burmese-language films
Burmese romantic drama films
Films shot in Myanmar
2016 romantic drama films